The 2011 Setanta Sports Cup was the sixth staging of the all Ireland association football competition. It commenced on 14 February 2011 with the final played on 14 May 2011.

The draw for the 2011 competition was made at Belfast City Hall on 13 December 2010.

Changes to structure
For the 2011 competition, the Setanta Cup was expanded to 12 teams, of which the four highest ranked teams received a bye into the quarter-finals. Also unlike previous years the tournament was played as a straight knock-out competition over two legs apart from the final.

Television Coverage

Setanta Sports broadcast live coverage of five games, starting with the quarter-finals.

First round

Four League of Ireland and Four IFA Premiership teams played each other in the first round over two games with the winners qualifying for the quarter-finals. The first legs were played on 14 February/21 February/1 March 2011 and the second legs were played on 28 February/1 March/7 March 2011. Sporting Fingal had originally been scheduled to compete in the tournament against Lisburn Distillery but withdrew on 9 February due to financial difficulties which saw them fold the following day and were replaced by UCD.

|}

Matches

First leg

Second leg

Dundalk won 6 − 4 on aggregate

Distillery won 2 − 0 on aggregate.

Cliftonville won 3 − 2 on aggregate.

Portadown won 4−1 on aggregate

Quarter−Finals
The winners of the four first-round games joined the four seeded teams (Shamrock Rovers, Sligo Rovers, Crusaders and Glentoran) who received a Bye into the quarter-finals. The first legs were played on 7 March/14 March/28 March 2011 and the second legs were played on 21 March/22 March/4 April 2011.

|}

Matches

First leg

Second leg

Dundalk won 2−1 on aggregate

Cliftonville won 10−6 on aggregate

Shamrock Rovers won 7−2 on aggregate.

Sligo Rovers won 5−0 on aggregate

Semi−Finals
The four winners of the quarter final games played each other over two games for a place in the 2011 Setanta Sports Cup final. The first legs were played on 4 April/11 April 2011 and the second legs were played on 18 April/19 April 2011. The draw for the semi-finals was made on 23 March 2011.

|}

Matches

First leg

Second leg

Dundalk won 5−2 on aggregate

Shamrock Rovers won 4−1 on aggregate

Final
The two winners of the semi final games played each other over one game to decide who would be crowned Setanta Sports Cup winners for 2011. The final took place on Saturday 14 May 2011 in Tallaght Stadium. Shamrock Rovers beat Dundalk to win the competition for the first time.

Match

Goalscorers
5 goals
  Mark Quigley (Dundalk)
  George McMullan (Cliftonville)

4 goals
  Kieran O'Connor (Cliftonville)
  Daniel Kearns (Dundalk)

3 goals
  Karl Sheppard (Shamrock Rovers)

2 goals

  Declan Caddell (Crusaders)
  Billy Dennehy (Shamrock Rovers)
  Stephen Garrett (Cliftonville)
  Ross Gaynor (Dundalk)
  Mark Holland (Cliftonville)
  Patrick Kavanagh (Shamrock Rovers)
  Ciarán Kilduff (Shamrock Rovers)
  Gary Liggett (Lisburn Distillery)

1 goal

  Curtis Allen (Linfield)
  Jordan Baker (Portadown)
  Kevin Braniff (Portadown)
  Johnny Breen (Dundalk)
  Gary Browne (Lisburn Distillery)
  Matty Burrows (Glentoran)
  Jason Byrne (Dundalk)
  Raffaele Cretaro (Sligo Rovers)
  Scott Davidson (Lisburn Distillery)
  John Dillon (Sligo Rovers)
  Eoin Doyle (Sligo Rovers)
  Rory Donnelly (Cliftonville)
  William Faulkner (Crusaders)
  Ronan Finn (Shamrock Rovers)
  Robert Garrett (Linfield)
  Michael Gault (Linfield)
  Michael Halliday (Crusaders)
  Daryl Horgan (Sligo Rovers)
  Dean Kelly (Shamrock Rovers)
  Jonathan Magee (Crusaders)
  David McMillan (St Patrick's Athletic)
  Dermot McVeigh (Cliftonville)
  Tim Mouncey (Portadown)
  Dave Mulcahy (St Patrick's Athletic)
  Joseph Ndo (Sligo Rovers)
  Keith O'Hara (Portadown)
  Gary O'Neill (Shamrock Rovers)
  Stephen Rice (Shamrock Rovers)
  John Russell (Sligo Rovers)
  Karl Somers (Bohemians)
  Vincent Sweeney (Crusaders)
  Peter Thompson (Linfield)

References

1
2010–11 in Northern Ireland association football
2011